Made for Love is an American science fiction black comedy-drama television series based on the 2017 novel of the same name by Alissa Nutting. The series premiered on HBO Max on April 1, 2021. It stars Cristin Milioti, Billy Magnussen, and Ray Romano. In June 2021, the series was renewed for a second season which premiered on April 28, 2022. Despite positive response to the series, in June 2022, the series was canceled after two seasons following the merger of HBO Max's parent company WarnerMedia with Discovery, Inc. to become Warner Bros. Discovery. It was removed from HBO Max in December 2022.

Premise
After a woman escapes from a suffocating 10-year marriage to a tech billionaire, she discovers her husband had her fitted with a tracking device. The device, which he implanted in her brain, allows him to track her location, watch her live, and know her "emotional data" as she tries to regain her independence.

Cast

Main

Cristin Milioti as Hazel Green
Billy Magnussen as Byron Gogol
Dan Bakkedahl as Herringbone
Noma Dumezweni as Fiffany
Ray Romano as Herbert Green
Augusto Aguilera as the Liver (season 1)
Caleb Foote as Bennett Hobbes (season 2; recurring season 1)
 Sarunas J. Jackson as Jay / Jasper (season 2; guest starring season 1)

Recurring
Patti Harrison as Bangles de la Morga
Kym Whitley as Judiff
 Dutch Johnson as Bruce
Raymond Lee as Keefus / Jeff (season 2)
 Angela Lin as Dr. Hau (season 2)
 Ashley Madekwe as Zelda (season 2)
 Chris Diamantopoulos as Agent Hank Walsh (season 2)
 Travis Van Winkle as Aaron Benson (season 2)
 James Urbaniak as Gogol interviewer (season 2)

Guest stars
 Paula Abdul as Anydoors (season 2)

Production

Development
Made for Love is an adaptation of the novel of the same name by Alissa Nutting. WarnerMedia gave the series a greenlight in June 2019 for their streaming service HBO Max. Patrick Somerville was the season one showrunner and writer, with S. J. Clarkson directing. Made for Love was the first original series from HBO Max. On June 28, 2021, HBO Max renewed the series for a second season. Executive producers Christina Lee and Nutting were showrunners for season two. The series was canceled after two seasons on June 10, 2022. An official statement on the series cancellation from representatives from HBO Max said:

Made for Love was removed from HBO Max in late December 2022. On January 31, 2023, it was announced that the series will be released on The Roku Channel and Tubi.

Casting
In July 2019, Cristin Milioti was cast to lead the series. Ray Romano was added in September 2019, with his deal only for one season. Noma Dumezweni would join in October 2019, with Billy Magnussen, Dan Bakkedahl and Augusto Aguilera added in November 2019. In December 2019, Raymond Lee was cast in a recurring role. In July 2021, Caleb Foote was promoted as a series regular for the second season. In November 2021, Sarunas J. Jackson who guest starred on the first season was promoted to a series regular while Chris Diamantopoulos and Angela Lin were cast in recurring roles with Paula Abdul to guest star for the second season.

Episodes

Series overview

Season 1 (2021)

Season 2 (2022)

Release
The series premiered on April 1, 2021 with the first 3 episodes available immediately. The second season premiered on April 28, 2022 with two episodes being released weekly.

Reception

Critical response
For the first season, review aggregator Rotten Tomatoes reported an approval rating of 94% based on 54 critic reviews, with an average rating of 7.20/10. The website's critics consensus reads,"Made for Love satirical riffs on technology are undeniably clever, but the most valuable special effects in this twisty odyssey are Cristin Milioti's charisma and comedic timing." Metacritic gave the first season a weighted average score of 68 out of 100 based on 18 critic reviews, indicating "generally favorable reviews".

Nina Metz of Chicago Tribune rated the series 3.5/4 and found the series "cheekily bewitching, both sardonic and deeply deeply disturbing..." Ben Travers of IndieWire gave the series a B- and said, "Herbert is the proof that Made for Love still knows the real deal: that true love can't be quantified, only felt. The more the show lets us feel it, the better off it will be."

Accolades

References

External links

2020s American black comedy television series
2020s American science fiction television series
2021 American television series debuts
2022 American television series endings
English-language television shows
Television series by Paramount Television
Television series about marriage
Television series set in 2020
Television shows set in California
Television shows based on American novels
HBO Max original programming